Nanorana polunini (common names: Langtang paa frog, Smith frog, Polunin's paa frog, Polunin's spiny frog) is a species of frog in the family Dicroglossidae. It is found in Nyalam County in southern Tibet (China), Nepal, and possibly Kashmir (India). It is a common species in Nepal but rare in China. It lives in stream habitats in montane forest.

References

polunini
Frogs of China
Amphibians of Nepal
Fauna of Tibet
Taxonomy articles created by Polbot
Amphibians described in 1951
Taxa named by Malcolm Arthur Smith